Human shields are legally protected persons—either civilians or prisoners of war—who are either coerced or volunteer to deter attacks by occupying the space between a belligerent and a legitimate military target. The use of human shields is forbidden by Protocol I of the Geneva Conventions. It is also a specific intent war crime as codified in the Rome Statute, which was adopted in 1998. The language of the Rome Statute prohibits "utilizing the presence of a civilian or other protected person to render certain points, areas, or military forces immune from military operations."

Historically the law of armed conflict only applied to sovereign states. Non-international conflicts were governed by the domestic law of the State concerned. Under the current terms of the Rome Statute the use of human shields is defined as a war crime only in the context of an international armed conflict.

After the end of World War II, non-international armed conflicts have become more commonplace. The Customary International Humanitarian Law guide suggests that rules prohibiting use of civilians as human shields are "arguably" customary in non-international armed conflict. The development and application of humanitarian law to modern asymmetric warfare is currently being debated by legal scholars.

History 

The laws of war are a crucial aspect of the history of human shields. This body of laws regulates the deployment of violence during armed conflict, but it is also an instrument that is used by warring parties to establish the legitimacy of power and the forms of humane violence. The laws of war first began to develop the distinction between military and civilian targets at the Second Hague Peace Conference of 1907.

During World War I, the concept of total war permitted most actions that supported the war effort. In "total war" targeting civilians was allowed, if it would support a military objective to demoralize the enemy. Indiscriminate bombing was considered an acceptable method to achieve the military advantage of defeating enemy morale and eroding popular support for the war effort. Early attempts to protect civilians as a class were largely unsuccessful. World War II was also fought within the framework of the total war concept.

The Geneva Conventions of 1949 were the first significant protections for civilians in war. These protections were expanded by the Additional Protocols in 1977. Protocol I requires that attacks be limited to military objectives, which are defined as targets that make an "effective contribution to military action" where the destruction of the target provides a "definite military advantage" to the attacker.

Legal doctrine 

Military necessity can justify the use of force in certain circumstances, where there is a military advantage to be gained by an attack.  When the use of force is excessive relative to its anticipated military advantage it is said to be disproportionate. Disproportionate force is prohibited under international law.

Risk to civilians does not bar military action, but the principle of proportionality requires that precautions be taken to minimize the harm to these protected persons. This analysis includes considerations like whether circumstances permit the attacker to time a military action to minimize the presence of civilians at the location.

Under the Rome Statute, using protected persons as shields in an international armed conflict is a war crime. There is currently debate amongst legal scholars about whether traditional proportionality analysis should be modified to take into account the culpability of actors who use human shields to gain a strategic advantage. In modern asymmetric warfare it has become difficult to distinguish between military targets and civilians, but State actors still rely on traditional principles that present challenges when applied to asymmetric conflicts. Non-state forces, like guerillas and terrorists, conceal themselves among civilian populations and may take advantage of this position to launch attacks. When military action targeting these unconventional combatants results in civilian deaths, State actors may blame the deaths on enemy forces who use human shields.

Proportionate proportionality analysis 

Some scholars, including Ammon Rubinstein and Yaniv Roznai, argue that the use of human shields should be a factor in determining whether the use of force was justifiable under the guiding principles of distinction and proportionality. In their view, the use of human shields undermines an attacker's right to self-defense because the military necessity of self-defense must be a consideration in the excessive force analysis. Rubinstein and Roznai have described this analysis as a "proportionate proportionality".

Rubinstein and Roznai argue that an attack that would be disproportionate ought to be considered proportionate, if the presence of civilians is due to the wrongful actions of the enemy.  They use the term "impeded party" to describe the burden placed on the attacking party under international humanitarian law norms. They point out that "attacking party" has traditionally been synonymous with the aggressor, but that it is often the attacker who is "defending democracy" and acting in self-defense when they use force in response to a prior attack.

Douglas Fischer believes that the increase of civilian casualties that began with the Vietnam War is partially due to an increased use of "illegal and perfidious" tactics in modern warfare, including the use of civilians as human shields. He has criticized Human Rights Watch for not including human shields doctrine as a factor in excessive force analysis.

Voluntary and involuntary 
Combatants in an armed conflict are prohibited from using protected civilians as involuntary human shields to support an unjust war effort. Civilians who are used as involuntary human shields by unlawful combatants do not lose their basic rights. The use of involuntary human shields does not release the other party from legal obligations to not target civilians or inflict excessive collateral damage.

Voluntary human shields may be considered "direct participants in hostilities", if they shield targeted personnel or properties. This could also be considered treason. However, if they are shielding protected personnel or properties, they may still retain their protected status. This debated area of customary international law has not yet been codified.

The United States and the European Union are considered the main sources for voluntary human shields. In 2003, human rights activists travelled to Baghdad to serve as human shields and protest the unpopular U.S. invasion. Also in 2003, American peace activist Rachel Corrie was crushed to death by an Israeli army bulldozer in Rafah while volunteering with the International Solidarity Movement as a human shield to prevent the demolition of homes in Palestine.

Current limitations of International Humanitarian Law 
While International Humanitarian Law (IHL) does prohibit attacks on civilians, the precautions that a power must take before an attack remain ill-defined. Proportionality remains a nebulous standard that does not set a predictable standard for when a military action against a human shield would be considered lawful. There is a lack of enforcement, and the increasing role of private actors and contractors on the battlefield presents additional challenges.

U.S. law 
During the Civil War, the United States adopted the Lieber Code, recognized by many scholars as the first detailed code governing conduct in war. Francis Lieber articulated an early version of the principle of proportionality: that civilians were not to be targeted, but were also not immune in all circumstances.

The use of human shields is prohibited and defined as a war crime by several U.S. military manuals. It is also defined as a crime triable by military commission under the US Military Commissions Act (2006).

Modern warfare tactic 
If the belligerent attacks in areas where human shields are used, this can weaken international and domestic support by exploiting harmed civilians. For nations that are particularly sensitive to collateral damage, an enemy's use of shields may effectively deter or delay military actions.

There have been numerous documented incidents where this tactic has not been successful in deterring attacks, including the Amiriyah shelter bombing during the First Gulf War. After the death of two Western activists serving as voluntary human shields in Gaza, Véronique Dudouet wrote that human shields have become less effective, since bad media publicity no longer deters soldiers from using lethal force against them.

References 

Criminal law
International law
International humanitarian law
Human rights
Geneva Conventions
War crimes
War crimes by type